Norman Adolphus Mozley (December 11, 1865 – May 9, 1922) was a U.S. Representative from Missouri's 14th congressional district.

Born on a farm in Johnson County, Illinois, Mozley attended the common schools.
He moved to Stoddard County, Missouri, in 1887 and taught school.
He studied law.
He was admitted to the bar in 1891 and practiced in Bloomfield, Missouri.

Mozley was elected as a Republican to the Fifty-fourth Congress (March 4, 1895 – March 3, 1897).
He was not a candidate for renomination in 1896.
He resumed the practice of law in Bloomfield, Missouri.
He served as commissioner of the State supreme court in 1919–1921.
He moved to Poplar Bluff, Missouri, and continued the practice of his profession.
He served as delegate to the State constitutional convention of 1921 and 1922.
He died in Bloomfield, Missouri, May 9, 1922.
He was interred in Bloomfield Cemetery.

References

1865 births
1922 deaths
Republican Party members of the United States House of Representatives from Missouri
People from Johnson County, Illinois
People from Bloomfield, Missouri